Heinrich XX, Prince Reuss of Greiz (29 June 17948 November 1859) was Prince Reuss of Greiz from 1836 to 1859.

Early life
Heinrich XX was born at Offenbach, Landgraviate of Hesse-Darmstadt, younger surviving son of Heinrich XIII, Prince Reuss of Greiz (1747–1817), (son of Heinrich XI, Prince Reuss of Greiz and Countess Conradine Reuss of Köstritz) and his wife,Princess Wilhelmine Louise of Nassau-Weilburg (1765–1837), (daughter of Charles Christian, Prince of Nassau-Weilburg and Princess Carolina of Orange-Nassau).

Prince Reuss of Greiz

At the death of his elder brother on 31 October 1836, Heinrich XX succeeded as the Prince Reuss of Greiz because of the Salic law that applied in the German principalities, his brother had died with no male heir.

Heinrich XX kept the principality administration based on absolutist principles at least until 1848 when because of the Revolution, was forced to issue a constitution but never came into force. The Prince, however, distinguished himself in military service in favor of the Austrian Empire.

Marriage
Heinrich XX married on 25 November 1834 at Castle Haid in Haid to Princess Sophie of Löwenstein-Wertheim-Rosenberg (1809–1838), third daughter of Karl, Prince of Löwenstein-Wertheim-Rosenberg, and his wife, Countess Sophie Luise of Windisch-Graetz . They had no children.

He married secondly on 1 October 1839 in Homburg vor der Höhe to Princess Caroline Amalie of Hesse-Homburg, eldest daughter of Gustav, Landgrave of Hesse-Homburg, and his wife, Princess Louise of Anhalt-Dessau.

They had five children:
 Princess Hermine Reuss of Greiz (25 December 1840 – 4 January 1890); married in 1862 Prince Hugo of Schönburg-Waldenburg, had issue.
 Prince Heinrich XXI Reuss of Greiz (11 February 1844 – 14 June 1844)
 Heinrich XXII, Prince Reuss of Greiz (28 March 1846 – 19 April 1902)
 Prince Heinrich XXIII Reuss of Greiz (27 June 1848 – 22 October 1861)
 Princess Marie Reuss of Greiz (19 March 1855 – 31 December 1909); married in 1875 Count Friedrich of Ysenburg and Büdingen in Meerholz (grandson of Ernst Casimir II, 2nd Prince of Ysenburg and Büdingen), no issue.

Ancestry

Notes and sources
L'Allemagne dynastique, Huberty, Giraud, Magdelaine, Reference: I 333
Gehrlein Thomas, The House of Reuss - Older and Younger line Börde Verlag 2006, 

1794 births
1859 deaths
People from Offenbach am Main
Princes of Reuss
Grand Crosses of the Order of Saint Stephen of Hungary